Daripura is a small village in Mysore, Karnataka province, India.

Location
Daripura is located on Mananthavady Road in Mysore district.

Demographics
Daripura has a population of 739 people. Children make up of 10 percent of the population. The literacy rate is 70%. The female literacy is only 62%.

Administration
Daripura village is administrated by a Sarpanch elected by the villagers.

Image Gallery

References

Villages in Mysore district